Norway participated in the Eurovision Song Contest 2022 in Turin, Italy with "Give That Wolf a Banana" performed by Subwoolfer. The Norwegian broadcaster  (NRK) organised the national final Melodi Grand Prix 2022 in order to select the Norwegian entry for the 2022 contest. 21 entries were selected to compete in the national final, which consists of seven shows: four semi-finals, two Last chance round shows and a final. Ten entries ultimately qualified to compete in the final that took place on 19 February 2022 and the winner was determined over two rounds of voting.

Background

Norway also has the two dubious distinctions of having finished last in the Eurovision final more than any other country and for having the most  (zero points) in the contest, the latter being a record the nation shared together with Austria. The country has finished last eleven times and has failed to score a point in four contests. In , "Fallen Angel" performed by Tix qualified to the final and placed eighteenth.

The Norwegian national broadcaster,  (NRK), broadcasts the event within Norway and organises the selection process for the nation's entry. NRK confirmed their intentions to participate at the 2022 Eurovision Song Contest on 28 May 2021. The broadcaster has traditionally organised the national final , which has selected the Norwegian entry for the Eurovision Song Contest in all but one of their participations. Along with their participation confirmation, the broadcaster revealed details regarding their selection procedure and announced the organization of  2022 in order to select the 2022 Norwegian entry.

Before Eurovision

Melodi Grand Prix 2022 

 2022 was the 60th edition of the Norwegian national final  which selected Norway's entry for the 2022 contest. The competition took place at the H3 Arena in Fornebu and consists of four semi-finals between 15 January and 5 February, two Last chance round shows on 7 and 12 February, and a final on 19 February. The national final was televised on NRK1 and NRK TV as well as streamed online at NRK's official website nrk.no.

Semi-finals and Last chance round 

 The first semi-final took place on 15 January 2022. "Black Flowers" performed by Frode Vassel qualified to the final.
 The second semi-final took place on 22 January 2022. "Dangerous" performed by Farida qualified to the final.
 The third semi-final took place on 29 January 2022. "Hammer of Thor" performed by Oda Gondrosen qualified to the final.
 The fourth semi-final took place on 5 February 2022. "Made of Glass" performed by Sofie Fjellvang qualified to the final.
 The Last chance round took place over two shows on 7 and 12 February 2022. "Fly" performed by Maria Mohn qualified to the final.

Final 
Ten songs consisting of the four semi-final and Last chance qualifiers alongside five pre-qualified songs competed during the final on 19 February 2022. The winner was selected over two rounds of voting, with the four-way Gold Final being dropped for the first time since 2015.

At Eurovision 
According to Eurovision rules, all nations with the exceptions of the host country and the "Big Five" (France, Germany, Italy, Spain and the United Kingdom) are required to qualify from one of two semi-finals in order to compete for the final; the top ten countries from each semi-final progress to the final. The European Broadcasting Union (EBU) split up the competing countries into six different pots based on voting patterns from previous contests, with countries with favourable voting histories put into the same pot. On 25 January 2022, an allocation draw was held which placed each country into one of the two semi-finals, as well as which half of the show they would perform in. Norway has been placed into the first semi-final, to be held on 10 May 2022, and has been scheduled to perform in the second half of the show.

Semi-final 
Once all the competing songs for the 2022 contest had been released, the running order for the semi-finals was decided by the shows' producers rather than through another draw, so that similar songs were not placed next to each other.

At the end of the show, Norway was announced as a qualifier for the final.

Voting

Points awarded to Norway

Points awarded by Norway

Detailed voting results
The following members comprised the Norwegian jury:
 Jowst – Music producer, songwriter, represented Norway in the Eurovision Song Contest 2017
 Mari Bølla – Singer, musician
 Mats Borch Bugge – Music editor-in-chief
 Royane – Singer
 Trine Rein – Singer, songwriter

References

External links

Full national final on nrk.no

2022
Countries in the Eurovision Song Contest 2022
Eurovision
Eurovision